The Grammy Award for Best Jazz Vocal Performance, Female was an honor presented at the Grammy Awards, a ceremony that was established in 1958 and originally called the Gramophone Awards, to female recording artists for quality jazz vocal performances (songs or albums). Honors in several categories are presented at the ceremony annually by the National Academy of Recording Arts and Sciences of the United States to "honor artistic achievement, technical proficiency and overall excellence in the recording industry, without regard to album sales or chart position".

Prior to 1981, the gender-neutral category of Best Jazz Vocal Performance existed. The first award specifically for female performances was presented to Ella Fitzgerald in 1981 for the album A Perfect Match. The category remained unchanged until 1985, when it was combined with the award for Best Jazz Vocal Performance, Male and presented in the genderless category. Gender-specific awards were once again presented from 1986 until 1991. In 1992, the two categories were combined and presented as the category Best Jazz Vocal Performance. This category was later renamed to Best Jazz Vocal Album beginning in 2001. While the gender-specific award has not been presented since the category merge in 1992, an official confirmation of its retirement has not been announced.

Fitzgerald holds the record for the most wins in this category, with four. Diane Schuur is the only other artist to receive the award more than once, with two consecutive wins. American artists have been presented with the award more than any other nationality, though it has been presented to a vocalist from the United Kingdom once. Betty Carter and Maxine Sullivan share the record for the most nominations without a win, with three each.

Recipients

 Each year is linked to the article about the Grammy Awards held that year.
 Award was combined with the Best Jazz Vocal Performance, Male category and presented in a genderless category known as Best Jazz Vocal Album.

See also

 Grammy Award for Best Jazz Vocal Performance, Duo or Group
 List of music awards honoring women

References

General
 

Specific

 
Awards established in 1981
Awards disestablished in 1991
Jazz Vocal Performance, Female
Jazz Vocal Performance, Female
Vocal Performance, Female
Music awards honoring women